Loutro (Greek, Modern: Λουτρό) is a small town in the municipality of Oichalia, Messenia, Peloponnese, Southern Greece. There is a small church in the east side of the town and a large square where children play soccer and hide-and-seek. Five other small towns surround Loutro: Filia, Meligalas, Malta, Meropi, and Oichalia.

See also
List of settlements in Messenia
Palaio Loutro

References

Populated places in Messenia